In Cauda Venenum (Latin for "Poison in the tail") is the thirteenth studio album by Swedish progressive metal band Opeth, released on 27 September 2019 through Moderbolaget and Nuclear Blast. It was released in two versions: a Swedish-language version and an English-language version. The band toured in support of the album throughout 2019 and into 2020. At 67 minutes and 57 seconds, it is the band's longest studio album.  It is also the band's last album to feature drummer Martin Axenrot before his departure in 2021.

Critical reception

The album received a score of 10 out of 10 from Wall of Sound, who stated it was "the best album the band has ever created in their prog era". Loudwire named it one of the 50 best metal albums of 2019.

Track listing

Personnel

Opeth
Mikael Åkerfeldt – lead and backing vocals, guitars and ramblings
Fredrik Åkesson – lead and rhythm guitars, backing vocals, whistles, coughs
Martin Axenrot – drums and percussion
Martín Méndez – bass guitars
Joakim Svalberg – keyboards and backing vocals

Charts

References

2019 albums
Opeth albums
Nuclear Blast albums